"The Faery Handbag" is a fantasy novelette by American writer Kelly Link, published in 2004.

Plot summary

The story follows Genevieve, a girl who spends a lot of time with her slightly eccentric grandmother Zofia.  Zofia claims to be from the country Baldeziwurlekistan and also to be the guardian of a community of fairies who now live in her black handbag.  She often tells outlandish tales about the beings in her handbag and blames them for her overdue library books.  Things take a turn for the worse when Genevieve's boyfriend, Jake, snatches Zofia's handbag with the intent of finding out if the stories about it are true.

Reception
"The Fairy Handbag" was the winner of the 2005 Hugo Award for Best Novelette, the 2006 Nebula Award for Best Novelette, and the 2005 Locus Award for Best Novelette. It was also nominated for the 2005 World Fantasy Award for Best Short Story.

References

2004 short stories
Hugo Award for Best Novelette winning works
Nebula Award for Best Novelette-winning works